Lee Roberts (born February 10, 1987) is an American professional basketball player. He played college basketball for the Findlay Oilers between 2005 and 2009, where he won an NCAA Division II national championship as a senior. Since 2011, Roberts has had consistent yearly stints in the NBL1 West in Australia. He has also consistently played seasons in South America since 2012.

Early life
Roberts was born in Seattle, Washington to army parents. He lived in Seattle for seven years before moving to Alaska, where he spent 2½ years before to moving to Cleveland, Ohio. He attended middle school and high school in the Cleveland area, as he played basketball for Midpark High School in Middleburg Heights. He received recognition playing for Midpark; in 2014, Roberts said "I was actually recruited for high jump, I was waiting for a couple of schools to ask about basketball and then Findlay offered me a full scholarship. I went to visit them and I was sold."

College career
Roberts played four years of college basketball for the University of Findlay between 2005 and 2009. The Oilers lost only 12 games in his four years at Findley, as they were GLIAC Tournament winners in 2007 and 2009, and NCAA Division II national champions in 2009. The Oilers entered the 2008–09 season as the top ranked team in NCAA Division II basketball. 36 games later, the Oilers remained on top as they were crowned the 2009 NCAA Division II men's basketball champions in Springfield, Massachusetts on March 28. The Oilers began their road to the championship by winning all 27 of their regular season games en route to a GLIAC South Division title. After winning the GLIAC Tournament, the Oilers had a flawless run during the 2009 NCAA Division II Tournament, including reaching the Final 4 for the first time in school history with an 89–79 win over C.W. Post behind a career-high 23 points from Roberts. In the national championship game against Cal Poly Pomona, Roberts had nine points, eight rebounds and three steals. Individually, Roberts earned GLIAC All-Tournament Team honors in 2008 and GLIAC South Division All-Defensive Team honors in 2009. As a senior in 2008–09, he appeared in all 36 games and averaged 10.4 points and 6.6 rebounds per game.

College statistics

|-
| style="text-align:left;"| 2005–06
| style="text-align:left;"| Findlay
| 29 || 0 || 10.3 || .694 || .000 || .458 || 2.0 || .1 || .4 || .4 || 2.7
|-
| style="text-align:left;"| 2006–07
| style="text-align:left;"| Findlay
| 31 || 1 || 14.9 || .654 || .000 || .708 || 4.6 || .2 || .5 || 1.0 || 6.8
|-
| style="text-align:left;"| 2007–08
| style="text-align:left;"| Findlay
| 31 || 27 || 25.4 || .633 || .500 || .753 || 6.1 || .8 || .9 || .8 || 12.5
|-
| style="text-align:left;"| 2008–09
| style="text-align:left;"| Findlay
| 36 || 36 || 26.6 || .609 || .000 || .645 || 6.6 || .5 || .5 || 1.0 || 10.4
|-

Professional career

Early years (2009–2012)
Coming out of college, Roberts signed with an agent from Germany, who set him up with a team in France. However, he was considered too short by his coach, and after two weeks he was cut. He subsequently moved to Germany to live with his agent. There he tried out for numerous teams, but money was always the issue. He landed at Bayern Munich, but after a month, he was cut after sustaining an injury. He finally settled in with a third-tier German team, Spot Up Medien Baskets Braunschweig. In 30 games for Braunschweig in 2009–10, he averaged 18.0 points, 7.9 rebounds, 1.5 assists and 1.2 steals per game.

In July 2010, Roberts signed with Danish team Team FOG Næstved. In 30 games for Næstved in 2010–11, he averaged 18.4 points, 13.2 rebounds, 1.6 assists, 1.6 steals and 1.2 blocks per game.

Following the conclusion of the Danish League season, Roberts moved to Australia and joined the Stirling Senators of the State Basketball League. He helped the Senators finish the regular season in fifth place with a 15–11 record, but couldn't help them go any further than the first round of the finals. Roberts averaged 26.1 points and 14.9 rebounds per game with Stirling in 2011 and was arguably one of the best five imports in the league.

In September 2011, Roberts signed with the Shinshu Brave Warriors of the Japanese BJ League. In 52 games for Shinshu, he averaged 16.9 points, 10.2 rebounds, 1.8 assists and 1.2 steals per game.

Following the conclusion of his season in Japan, Roberts returned to the State Basketball League and joined the Kalamunda Eastern Suns. He helped the Suns qualify for the post-season for just the second time in their history, earning the eighth seed with a 12–14 record. They were subsequently knocked out in straight sets by the Wanneroo Wolves, losing their quarter-final series 2–0. In 15 games for Kalamunda, he averaged 23.2 points, 17.8 rebounds, 3.5 assists and 2.1 steals per game.

Argentina (2012–2016)
In September 2012, Roberts signed with Argentinian team Estudiantes Concordia. In May 2013, he helped Estudiantes win the 2012–13 TNA Championship with a 3–2 victory over San Martín in the finals series, thus guaranteeing Estudiantes promotion to the LigaA for the 2013–14 season. Roberts had a 16-point performance in the deciding Game 5. In 36 games during the 2012–13 season, he averaged 17.7 points, 11.8 rebounds, 1.1 assists, 1.1 steals and 1.0 blocks per game.

In July 2013, Roberts re-signed with Estudiantes Concordia for the 2013–14 season. In 44 games for Estudiantes in 2013–14, he averaged 16.7 points, 10.8 rebounds, 1.6 assists and 1.4 steals per game.

In April 2014, Roberts signed with Venezuelan team Bucaneros de La Guaira. He spent a month in Venezuela and averaged 10.4 points and 6.1 rebounds in 10 games.

In June 2014, Roberts returned to the State Basketball League for a third stint, this time joining the Perth Redbacks. He helped the Redbacks finish the regular season in third place with a 17–9 record, and guided them through to the semi-finals where they were defeated 2–0 by the eventual champion East Perth Eagles. In 15 games for the Redbacks in 2014, he averaged 24.8 points, 14.0 rebounds, 2.6 assists, 1.7 steals and 1.3 blocks per game.

Following the conclusion of the 2014 SBL season, Roberts returned to Argentina to play for Ciclista Olímpico. In 55 games for Olímpico in 2014–15, he averaged 17.6 points, 10.1 rebounds, 1.4 assists and 1.2 steals per game.

Roberts parted ways with Ciclista Olímpico following the 2014–15 season, but remained in Argentina for a fourth season, joining Libertad Sunchales. The season did not start off well, as Roberts suffered rib injuries in a bar fight in October 2015. The fighting started when Roberts went to the aid of his girlfriend who was being accosted by a number of men in a bar in the city of Rafaela. He ended up leaving the team in April 2016, citing personal problems. In 52 games for Libertad in 2015–16, he averaged 18.4 points, 9.5 rebounds, 1.5 assists and 1.1 steals per game.

Championship in Israel (2016–2017)
In August 2016, Roberts signed with Israeli team Ironi Nes Ziona. A month later, he helped Nes Ziona claim the Leumit Cup title after overcoming Maccabi Rehovot in the final. Nes Ziona finished the regular season in fourth position with a 16–10 record and advanced through to the National League Finals, where they swept Hapoel Be'er Sheva 3–0 in the best-of-five series. In 35 games during the 2016–17 season, he averaged 16.4 points, 8.7 rebounds, 1.0 assists, 1.6 steals and 1.2 blocks per game.

Championship with Perth Redbacks (2017)
In May 2017, Roberts joined the Perth Redbacks for the rest of the 2017 SBL season. He helped the Redbacks finish the regular season in fourth place on the ladder with a 16–10 record, and guided them through to their first SBL Grand Final since 1999. In the championship decider on September 2, 2017, Roberts recorded 28 points and 17 rebounds in a Grand Final MVP performance that led the Redbacks to a 103–70 win over the Joondalup Wolves, as the Redbacks claimed their first championship since 1997. In 19 games for the Redbacks in 2017, he averaged 22.1 points, 10.6 rebounds, 2.7 assists and 1.5 steals per game.

Italy (2017–2018)
On August 12, 2017, Roberts signed with Italian team Acea Virtus Roma for the 2017–18 season. In 31 games, he averaged 18.7 points, 8.3 rebounds, 1.6 assists and 1.1 steals per game.

Third stint with Perth Redbacks (2018)
On February 5, 2018, Roberts signed with the Perth Redbacks for the 2018 season, returning to the team for a third stint. He joined the team in mid-May following the conclusion of his season in Italy. Roberts had a subdued regular season, scoring 20 points or more just three times. The Redbacks finished the regular season in third place with a 19–7 record. In the first game of the quarter-finals, Roberts recorded 30 points and 14 rebounds in a 114–109 win over the Stirling Senators. The Redbacks went on to lose in three games to the Senators. In 16 games, he averaged 15.4 points, 7.6 rebounds and 2.6 assists per game.

Return to Argentina (2018–2019)
In July 2018, Roberts signed with San Martín Corrientes of the Liga Nacional de Básquet, returning to Argentina for a fifth season. In 39 games, he averaged 13.6 points, 9.2 rebounds, 1.9 assists and 1.1 steals per game.

Fourth stint with Perth Redbacks (2019)
In June 2019, Roberts re-joined the Perth Redbacks for the rest of the 2019 SBL season, despite being unable to qualify for the finals. In the Redbacks' season finale on July 26, Roberts scored a season-high 30 points in a 106–80 win over the Cockburn Cougars. In seven games, he averaged 25 points, 9.29 rebounds and 1.43 assists per game.

Uruguay and Western Australia (2019–present)
In August 2019, Roberts signed with Atlético Aguada of the Uruguayan Basketball League. In 24 league games, he averaged 18.7 points, 10.5 rebounds, 2.4 assists and 1.5 steals per game. He also averaged 22.5 points, 7.5 rebounds and 1.8 assists in four BCLA games.

In July 2020, Roberts joined the Joondalup Wolves of the State Basketball League for the West Coast Classic. In six games, he averaged 21.0 points, 10.0 rebounds, 1.3 assists and 1.5 steals per game.

Between March and May 2021, Roberts played for Atlético Aguada in Uruguay. He returned to Western Australia in June 2021 and joined the East Perth Eagles for the rest of the 2021 NBL1 West season. In nine games, he averaged 19.44 points, 12.11 rebounds, 1.66 assists and 1.55 steals per game.

For the 2021–22 season, Roberts joined Club Atlético Peñarol. He helped the team reach the Uruguayan Finals, where they lost 4–1 to Biguá. In 38 games, he averaged 16.2 points, 8.3 rebounds and 1.2 steals per game.

In February 2022, Roberts re-signed with the Eagles for the 2022 NBL1 West season. In 10 games, he averaged 17.6 points, 8.3 rebounds, 2.0 assists and 1.7 steals per game.

Roberts returned to Club Atlético Peñarol for the 2022–23 season.

References

External links

Lee Roberts at athletics.findlay.edu
Lee Roberts at basketballbeyondborders.com
SBL stats

1987 births
Living people
American expatriate basketball people in Argentina
American expatriate basketball people in Australia
American expatriate basketball people in Denmark
American expatriate basketball people in Germany
American expatriate basketball people in Israel
American expatriate basketball people in Italy
American expatriate basketball people in Japan
American expatriate basketball people in Uruguay
American expatriate basketball people in Venezuela
American men's basketball players
Basketball players from Cleveland
Bucaneros de La Guaira players
Centers (basketball)
Ciclista Olímpico players
Club Atlético Peñarol basketball players
Club San Martín de Corrientes basketball players
Estudiantes Concordia basketball players
Findlay Oilers men's basketball players
Ironi Nes Ziona B.C. players
Libertad de Sunchales basketball players
Pallacanestro Virtus Roma players
Power forwards (basketball)
Shinshu Brave Warriors players